Balram vs. Tharadas is a 2006 Indian Malayalam-language drama film directed by I.V. Sasi, written by T. Damodaran and S. N. Swamy, and starring Mammootty, Katrina Kaif, Mukesh and  Siddique. It was a crossover sequel of the malayalam movies Athirathram & Inspector Balram. Mammootty plays double roles as Balram and underworld don Tharadas, reprising his roles from the 1991 film Inspector Balram (also from Aavanazhi, its prequel) and 1984's Athirathram. The film is the only Malayalam film featuring popular Bollywood actress Katrina Kaif.

Plot
A large cache of arms is discovered in the land belonging to the local businessman Hussein Sahib. On investigation, Inspector Varma finds that Hussein Sahib has no idea about this, but the land was used by someone called Anali Bhaskaran. The Inspector, along with his colleagues Sudhakaran go to arrest Bhaskaran, but they are given a good fight. As the police are being beaten, the screen alternates between a police jeep appearing on the scene and Anali Bhaskaran trying to knife people. Suddenly a hand appears in the scene and beats Bhaskaran.

He is still the same no-nonsense arrogant person, Balram, who is now a DSP who follows his heterodox ways of investigation. Anali Bhaskaran reveals under interrogation that Hussein Sahib's son Salim is involved in this. Hussein Sahib says that his son left the house sometime back, and he has no idea where he is. Then at this point, it starts raining characters as if it is the start of monsoon season.

In a span of few minutes, we get three villains, MLA Rani, a DGP, Balram's boss, DYSP George, Policewoman Dakshayani, a Chief Minister, a minister called Mustafa, Srini, the editor of a yellow journal, and a policeman called Ummar. Balram concludes that Tharadas was behind all this, and the scene switches to Dubai.

After beating his associate, Tharadas meets the minister Mustafa and does some business. He also wants a favor from the minister. He wants a ring to be passed to his girlfriend Supriya, who is an actress. Once the people and linkages are established, the game is set in motion in an even faster pace. Balram concludes that the only way to trap Tharadas is to arrest Supriya. As expected, Tharadas lands in Kerala and takes on Balram, and tries to stop the actions of Balram. In the end, Tharadas shoots down DYSP George who was one of his ally who had turned against him, and this is witnessed by Balram, after which Tharadas surrenders to Balram.

Cast

 Mammootty as DYSP Balram (an honest and upright police officer) and Tharadas (a business tycoon and smuggler)
Gowri Madhu as Vaduthala Valsala
 Katrina Kaif as Supriya Menon
 Mukesh as CI Satheesh Varma
 Siddique as DYSP George 
 Vani Viswanath as MLA Rani Mathew
 Prem Prakash as Nandakumar, Chief Minister of Kerala
 Jagadish as ASI Sudhakaran
 Augustine as SI Ummer
 Kunchan as SI Radhakrishnan aka "Samshayam" Vasu
 Kalpana as SI Dakshayani
 Devan as DGP Madhavadas IPS, State Police Chief
 Abu Salim as CI Kasim
 Akhila as Jyothi, IB officer (fake) 
 Sreenivasan as Sreeni
 Kundara Johny as DYSP Alex George, Anti Terrorist Squad
 Rizabawa as Hussain Sahib
 Spadikam George as Sunderashan
 Subair as Minister Musthafa
 Sadiq as Rafeeq
 Rajmohan Unnithan as a Politician
 Sreenath as Jayakrishnan, Customs officer
 Anil Murali as Williams
 Arun as Salim Sahib
 Santhosh Jogi as Shivankutty
 Mohan Raj as Anali Bhaskaran
 Chandra Lakshman as Shanimol, Salim's wife
 Ponnamma Babu as Hussien Sahib's wife
 Sukumari as DySP Alex's mother
 Ambika Mohan as DYSP Alex's wife
 Poornima Anand as Mrs. Radhakrishnan
 Kulappulli Leela as Narayani (guest appearance)
 Afsal as himself in the song "Mathapoove.." (guest appearance)
 Anwar Sadat as himself in the song "Mathapoove.." (guest appearance)
 Rimi as herself in the song "Mathapoove.." (guest appearance)

Music 

The soundtrack for the film was composed by Jassie Gift.

Production
It was a big budget film at that time, made at a cost above .

Release
The film was released on 28 April 2006. Due to the film's strong opening figures, it was a hit.

References

External links
 
 

2006 action thriller films
2006 films
2000s Malayalam-language films
Films set in Dubai
Films shot in Kozhikode
Films shot in Kannur
Films shot in Goa
Fictional portrayals of the Kerala Police
Films with screenplays by T. Damodaran
Films with screenplays by S. N. Swamy
Indian sequel films
Balram3
Films directed by I. V. Sasi
Indian action comedy-drama films
Films scored by Jassie Gift